Events from the year 1759 in art.

Events
Thomas Gainsborough and his family move to Bath, England.

Works

Giambettino Cignaroli – Death of Cato
Thomas Gainsborough
Self-portrait
Thomas Wollaston
Joshua Reynolds – Kitty Fisher as Cleopatra Dissolving the Pearl
John Shackleton – George II (British Museum, London)

Births
 January 21 – François Baillairgé, Canadian artist of woodworking, wood-carving, and architecture (died 1830)
 February 10 – Carlo Lasinio, Italian engraver (died 1838)
 July 10 – Pierre-Joseph Redouté, Belgian flower painter (died 1840)
 July 27 – Pierre Charles Baquoy, French painter and engraver especially of famous historical characters (died 1829)
 August 15 – Jean-Baptiste Jacques Augustin, French miniature painter (died 1832)
 August 16 – Carl Frederik von Breda, Swedish painter to the Swedish court (died 1818)
 December 16 – Charles Guillaume Alexandre Bourgeois, French physicist and painter (died 1832)
 December 29 – Julius Caesar Ibbetson, landscape painter (died 1817)
 date unknown
 Jean-Baptiste Audebert, French natural history artist (died 1800)
 Henri Auguste, Parisian gold- and silversmith (died 1816)
 Louis-André-Gabriel Bouchet, French historical painter (died 1842)
 Adam Buck, Irish neo-classical portraitist and miniature painter (died 1833)
 Antoine Michel Filhol, French engraver (died 1812)
 Christian Gullager, Danish artist specializing in portraits and theatrical scenery (died 1826)
 John Frederick Miller, English illustrator (died 1796)
 Rafael Ximeno y Planes, Spanish painter (died 1825)

Deaths
January 15 - Bernardo Germán de Llórente, Spanish painter of the late-Baroque period (born 1685)
March 27 – August Johann Rösel von Rosenhof, miniature painter and naturalist (born 1705)
April 4 – Christoffer Foltmar, Danish painter of miniatures and organist (born 1718)
May 12 – Lambert-Sigisbert Adam, French sculptor (born 1700)
June 20 – Margareta Capsia, Finnish painter (born 1682)
July 25 - Theodoor Verhaegen, sculptor from the Southern Netherlands (born 1701)
date unknown
Placido Costanzi, Italian painter of the Costanzi family of artists (born 1702)
Bernardo de' Dominici, Italian art historian and painter (born 1683)
Gaetano Fanti, Italian fresco painter (born 1687)
Alberto Pullicino, Maltese painter (born 1719)
Jeong Seon, Korean landscape painter (born 1676)
Wang Shishen, Chinese painter (born 1686)
Kaspar Anton von Baroni-Cavalcabo, Italian painter (born 1682)

 
Years of the 18th century in art
1750s in art